Potsdam Pirschheide station is a station on the Berlin outer ring. It was opened in 1958 as Potsdam Süd (south) station and was called Potsdam Hauptbahnhof (main station) from 1961 to 1993. In this period it was the most important station on the outer ring after Berlin Schönefeld Flughafen station.

Although the station is far from the centre of Potsdam on the Pirschheide (Pirsch heath) to the southwest of the town, in its heyday as the main station it had substantial passenger traffic and often reached its capacity limit. With the reunification, however, the station rapidly lost importance and was almost completely closed except for a single platform in the lower part of the station. It is classified by Deutsche Bahn as a category 6 station.

History

As a result of the four-power status of the former capital of Germany and the deepening division of Berlin and Germany, the operation of railway traffic in and around West Berlin became complicated for Deutsche Reichsbahn (DR), which now operated railways in East Germany (GDR). To solve this problem, it was planned to build a bypass that would connect the northwest, west and southwest of the Berlin region to the reorganised capital of the GDR, East Berlin, bypassing West Berlin. By 1954, large parts of the new outer ring were completed and on 30 September 1956, the last section of the ring between Golm and Saarmund, including the crossing of the Templiner See (lake), on the outskirts of Potsdam was taken into operation.

Construction and commissioning 

The station at the intersection of the Berlin outer ring with the Jüterbog–Nauen railway (which connected Potsdam Stadt—now Potsdam Hauptbahnhof—via Seddin freight yard and Seddin to Michendorf) was built in 1956/57 and officially inaugurated on 18 January 1958 as Potsdam Süd (south). It is in a wooded area called Pirschheide ("Deerstalking heath"), about 0.8 km from the southern end of the Potsdam built-up area and about 3 km from the city centre.

The station was designed in the design office of Deutsche Reichsbahn. The architects were Wolfgang Dressler and Walter Mempel. The building was designed as a two-level interchange station (known in German as a Turmbahnhof, literally a "tower station") at the junction of the two railway lines and set out as a lower level with an island platform with two platform faces and an upper level with two island platforms, four platform faces and two through tracks for the (very heavy) freight traffic. All platforms were interconnected with stairs and tunnels. A large station building was built in the typical architectural style of the late 1950s. A tunnel ran from the station hall to the lower platform and another tunnel ran to the stairs leading to the upper platforms. The building housed, along with the ticket office, typical station facilities for retail and hospitality as well as facilities for railway employees.

Importance in the GDR 

The station was renamed Potsdam Hauptbahnhof on 2 October 1960. All long-distance trains and Interzonal trains (on the Aachen/Cologne–Görlitz and Rostock–Munich routes) passing through Potsdam stopped here. The local express trains between East Berlin and Potsdam, operated with double-deck carriages (initially painted dark green, later red-beige) were known unofficially as Sputnik trains. The upper level tracks were often congested, so that trains often had to wait outside the station. The old Potsdam station, which was closer to the city centre, was named Potsdam Stadt (city) and, from the establishment of the Berlin Wall until 1990, it was served by local diesel trains only. Commuter trains ran from the lower platforms of Hauptbahnhof to Babelsberg via Potsdam Stadt and towards Wildpark or Beelitz and Jüterbog.

A new route of the Potsdam tramway was opened on 11 January 1958 to a terminus at the station. In addition, a bus station, a taxi rank, a petrol station and parking for bicycles were provided.

Effects of unification from 1990 

With German reunification, the station lost its importance as long-distance passenger trains again ran over the Berlin Stadtbahn instead of the Berlin outer ring. Since 1991, no long-distance trains have stopped at the station, which was renamed Potsdam Pirschheide in 1993. The Potsdam Stadt station once again became Potsdam’s main station and was renamed Potsdam Hauptbahnhof in 1999. Pirschheide Station initially remained important for regional traffic. In addition to the Sputnik trains to Werder (Havel) or Berlin Schönefeld Flughafen and Berlin-Karlshorst, trains still ran hourly on the western section of the outer ring to Falkenhagen until 1994 or temporarily on a through route between Oranienburg and Ludwigsfelde. In the mid-90s, there was a brief attempt to establish a Regional-Express service from Potsdam to Finsterwalde and Cottbus. Despite a direct tram connection in Pirschheide, this service had no success and it was abandoned in 1997. From the lower level of the station, services ran every two hours towards Beelitz and Jüterbog in one direction and Potsdam Stadt in the other. The ticket counter at the station was closed in 1994 because of lack of demand.

In 1998, the direct service to Schönefeld was rerouted and has since run through the lower level of the station. The platform on the upper level continued to be served until 1999 by a single daily pair of trains from Strausberg to Golm. In 1999, this part of the station was closed. Only the two through freight tracks are still open.

Present and future 

The infrastructure resembles a ghost station that has been left to decay. Weeds on the platforms, the shattered panes of the sealed-off stairwells and boarded-up waiting rooms characterise this image. All the walls are covered with graffiti and only the platform roof is still intact. The tracks on the platforms of the upper station and all crossovers have been dismantled. Only the two main-line through tracks remain. The old information displays made in Czechoslovakia on the upper platforms are still present, although they are no longer functional. Since the electrification of the lower track in 1999, there is only one platform (platform 1, formerly platform 7) in operation. The exit signals of the crossing track are switched off, but are operational, the position of the points has been locked, but they still exist.

The station building that was built in 1958 was closed in 2006/07; only the restaurant stayed open. It has notably deteriorated and now has no windows or doors.  It was walled up in 2007. Proposals to demolish it have been precluded by its notable  functionalist architecture in the style of the late 1950s, which would justify conversion for new uses. The stairs between the upper and the lower levels of the station have also been closed.  The route from the station forecourt that connected via the former track 8 now connects directly to the lower platform. The tunnel from the upper level to the station building was demolished in 2012.

In 2012, an entrepreneur from Werder (Havel) acquired  the station building. Originally he planned to use the area for his company. Once a different solution was developed for the company’s premises, he considered using the building as a cultural centre. The Märker Bowling restaurant is to remain in the building.
 
The lower platform is used by regional traffic. From 1998 to 2011, the Regionalbahn RB 22 service ran from Potsdam via Caputh to Schönefeld; since December 2011, service RB 23 has run from Potsdam to Michendorf via Pirschheide. Since then the RB 22 service has run via the Berlin outer ring and through the abandoned upper level of Pirschheide station.

In the immediate vicinity of the station are the Sparkassen (state savings bank) academy, several hotels and recreational areas of interest for hikers: the Templiner See and the Pirschheide. Reopening of operations on the upper level is currently being investigated in order to link the RB 22 and RB 23 services and to make possible journeys between Caputh and Michendorf towards Schönefeld over the outer ring with a change at the station. Furthermore, there would be an interchange from the RB 22 to the bus and tram services to Potsdam and Werder.
 
In 2013, Potsdam Pirschheide station, including its paved forecourt, was heritage-listed by the state of Brandenburg.

Rail services

The station is now only a stop on request for Regionalbahn service RB 23 at the lower level of the station, while the RB 22 service passes through the former upper level of the station without stopping.

The station forecourt is served by tram lines 91 and 98 and bus route 695 of the Verkehrsbetrieb Potsdam (the Potsdam municipal transport company), and regional bus routes 580, 631 and N31.

See also 

 List of railway stations in Brandenburg

References

External links

  
 

Pirschheide
Pirschheide
Railway stations in Brandenburg
Railway stations in Germany opened in 1958